Yıldız Holding is a Turkish conglomerate that is best known for manufacturing food products. The company also produces other consumer goods and has its own retail, private equity and real estate operations.

Yıldız Holding is among the largest food manufacturers in CEEMEA (Central and Eastern Europe, the Middle East, and Africa), generating revenues of 42.3 billion TL in 2017 across all businesses. The company employs 56,000 people and has 80 factories (25 of which are outside Turkey).

Yıldız Holding has over 320 brands available in more than 130 countries. Through Yıldız Holding's core focus on biscuits, cakes and confectionery, the company has become number two in the world in the sweet biscuits category and number seven in the chocolate category by revenue.

Business units

Pladis

Pladis is a global biscuit and confectionery company which was established in January 2016 when Yıldız Holding brought together United Biscuits, Ülker, Godiva Chocolatier (excluding stores), and DeMet's Candy Company.

Yıldız Food
Yıldız Food operates the production and sales of frozen foods, processed meat, and ingredients and oils through various companies including Kerevitaş, Aytaç, and Bizim Yağ. Adapazarı Sugar owns one of the small coal-fired power stations in Turkey.

Yıldız Non-food
The non-food division of Yıldız makes a range of products from personal care items to packaging, and is the umbrella company for retail chains including ŞOK and Bizim Toptan.

Gözde Venture Capital
Gözde is Yıldız Holding's private equity company and is listed on the Borsa Istanbul Stock Exchange under the ticker symbol GOZDE. Gözde invests in non-food companies, such as packaging, industrial minerals and FMCG with financial and operational restructuring needs.

History

1940s
Sabri and Asim Ülker, whose parents migrated from the Crimea to Turkey, began manufacturing biscuits in 1944, producing 75 tons in their first year. Capacity was tripled in 1948 with the opening of the company's first factory in Topkapı.

1970s
The 1970s was a period of expansion, with the company moving biscuit production to Ankara in 1970. Ulker produced chocolate for the first time in 1972, which proved so popular that a dedicated chocolate factory was built in Istanbul in 1974. In the same year, the company began exporting to the Middle East and opened its own R&D division in order to compete with international competitors.

1980s
The company began manufacturing some of its own equipment in the 1980s. In 1984 the Topkapı Makine facility was founded to create the machines required for biscuit and chocolate production within the group.

In 1989, Yıldız Holding was created to consolidate all operations and businesses within the group.

1990s
Yıldız Holding continued to expand its operations, entering the margarine, vegetable oil and industrial food oil market in 1992 and the dairy industry in 1996.

The company also increased its international expansion, partnering with both Pendik Nişasta and it began to begin producing the first cake bars and filled cakes in Turkey.

2000s
Further international growth saw the company establish manufacturing plants in a number of countries and the acquisition of premium chocolatier, Godiva in 2008.

Yıldız began producing ice cream, baby food, soda and cola-style beverages and instant coffee. The company also entered the cereal market with Kellogg's, creating Ulker Kellogg's in 2005.

In 2009, Yıldız combined operations with Danish gum technologist Gumlink.

2010s
Yıldız saw further growth in 2012, when it formed a partnership with SCA, a paper and personal care company, and acquired retail chain ŞOK Supermarkets. In 2013, Yıldız acquired meat processor Aytaç.

In 2014 Yıldız Holding purchased DeMet's Candy Company in the United States and United Biscuits in the UK.

In 2016 the company brought together its core biscuit and confectionery businesses Godiva Chocolatier, United Biscuits, Ulker and DeMet's Candy Company, to form a new global company, “pladis”.

In 2018, in the course of the Turkish currency and debt crisis, 2018, Yildiz Holding unexpectedly requested its creditors to restructure as much as $7 billion in loans.

References

External links
Official Website

 

 
Holding companies of Turkey
Food and drink companies based in Istanbul
Conglomerate companies established in 1944
Conglomerate companies of Turkey
Food and drink companies established in 1944
Multinational companies headquartered in Turkey
Turkish companies established in 1944
Coal in Turkey